The Soaring Eagle Casino & Resort, or simply Soaring Eagle Casino, is a Casino, Hotel, and Entertainment venue located near Mount Pleasant, Michigan. It is owned and operated by the Saginaw Chippewa Tribal Nation. Soaring Eagle Casino launched its Michigan online casino and online sport betting app, Eagle Casino & Sports, in 2022 in partnership with platform provider GAN.

Features 

Soaring Eagle offers a typical selection of pit and table games such as blackjack, roulette, craps, three card poker, and Let It Ride. In addition to slot machines in the main casino, an additional gaming hall called the "Slot Palace" is located across the street and offers Bingo, Keno, and additional slot machines.

The casino also includes an 18-table poker room, which features games such as Texas hold 'em, seven-card stud, and Omaha hi-low. The poker room also features a bad beat jackpot and weekly Texas hold 'em tournaments.

The resort includes four restaurants, a pool with an underwater sound system, a full-service spa, an arcade, a day care, concert hall and amphitheater.

Venues
Entertainment
The Entertainment Hall: Former bingo hall converted into a concert venue in 2000. 
Capacity: 3,260 reserved seating, 3,285 general admission
Soaring Eagle Outdoor Arena: Amphitheater that opened in 2005. Hosts the annual "Outdoor Concert Series"
Capacity: 5,089 reserved, 11,000 general admission
Meeting rooms
Saginaw Chippewa Ballroom
Three Fires Room
Ojibway Room

Renovations 
In August 2017 a series of renovations were approved by the Saginaw Chippewa Tribal Council. The plans include incorporating a new sports bar and night club near the gaming floor, updating the Entertainment Hall, enclosing the non-smoking area, re-designing the Kid's Quest and Cyber Quest areas, a new high-limit and VIP lounge area, a relocated poker room and re-branding of the current sub shop.

See also
List of casinos in Michigan

References

External links 
 
 Saganing Eagles Landing Casino

Casinos in Michigan
Casino hotels
Hotels in Michigan
Music venues in Michigan
Native American casinos
Buildings and structures in Isabella County, Michigan
Tourist attractions in Isabella County, Michigan
Native American history of Michigan